Karl Ballmer (23 February 1891 – 7 September 1958) was a Swiss painter, anthroposophical philosopher, and writer.

Life
In 1918, he met Rudolf Steiner. Shortly after 1920 he settled in Hamburg.  After studying anthroposophy as autodidact for seven years, he tried to bring Rudolf Steiner into the discussions of the scientific world.  In 1928, he published the Rudolf Steiner-Blätter for those who wanted to comprehend the so-called Rudolf Steiner Event.

In 1938, together with his friend, Edith van Cleef, he leaves Hamburg, Germany and moves back to Switzerland.  In Lamone near Lugano he lives painting and writing for the remaining 20 years in almost total solitude. He writes about physics, philosophy, and theology – as anthroposophy. In his writings he targets fundamentals without compromises; he possesses huge natural scientific and spiritual scientific knowledge, thus the level of his publications was mostly very high.

In studying his works readers can experience sensitive self-encounters, (sadly) often without further consequences (in their own development). Ballmer, similar to Steiner, could be himself seen as an "Event" in development of mankind – as confrontation with the world process, of which he takes part.

Karl Ballmer's research in cognitive science and the evolution of the
human self-awareness was influenced mainly by two books, 1) Rudolf Steiner's "Occult Science" (1909) and 2) Louis-Claude de Saint-Martin's
"Irrthümer und Wahrheit, oder Rückweiß für die Menschen auf das allgemeine Principium aller Erkenntniß"  (1782). (See quote from Karl Ballmer's "Deutsche Physik — von einem Schweizer" in the latter.)

Works
Rudolf Steiner und die jüngste Philosophie, Hamburg 1928
Ernst Haeckel und Rudolf Steiner, Hamburg 1929
Das Goetheanum Rudolf Steiners, in: Bau-Rundschau, Hamburg 1930
Aber Herr Heidegger! Zur Freiburger Rektoratsrede Martin Heideggers. Foreword by Fritz Eymann, Basel 1933
Der Macher bin ich, den Schöpfer empfange ich, 1933
Rembrandt oder die Tragödie des Lichtes, 1933
A. E. Biedermann heute! Zur theologischen Aufrüstung, Bern 1941
Das Christentum der Berner Universität, Aarau 1941
Ein Schweizerischer Staatsrechtler: Karl Barth, Melide 1941
Elf Briefe über Wiederverkörperung, Besazio 1953
Briefwechsel über die motorischen Nerven, Besazio 1953
Editorin Marie Steiner, Besazio 1954
Philologin Marie Steiner, Besazio 1954
Die erste Mitteilung über soziale Dreigliederung, Besazio 1957

Posthumous:
Die Rolle der Persönlichkeit im Weltgeschehen, Besazio 1964
Deutschtum und Christentum in der Theosophie des Goetheanismus, Besazio 1966
Troxlers Auferstehung, Besazio 1966
Die Judenfrage, Besazio 1975
Die Zukunft des deutschen Idealismus, Besazio 1975
„Wissenschaft“, Besazio 1976
Erlösung der Tiere durch Eurythmie. Zu Rudolf Steiners „Eurythmie“, Besazio 1976
Die Aktie, Symbol der Schande, Besazio 1976
Rudolf Steiners Philosophie der Freiheit als Analyse des Christusbewusstseins, Besazio 1979
Von der Natur zur Schöpfung. Thomismus und Goetheanismus, Besazio 1979
Anthroposophie und Christengemeinschaft, Besazio 1980
Siegen 1995, 
Abschied vom „Leib-Seele-Problem“, Siegen 1994, 
Die moderne Physik, ein philosophischer Wert?, Siegen 1994, 
Synchronizität. Gleichzeitigkeit, Akausalität und „Schöpfung aus dem Nichts“ bei C. G. Jung und Rudolf Steiner, Siegen 1995, 
Das Ereignis Rudolf Steiner, Siegen 1995, 
Max Stirner und Rudolf Steiner. Vier Aufsätze, Siegen 1995, 
Deutsche Physik – von einem Schweizer, Siegen 1995, 
Anknüpfend an eine Bemerkung über James Joyce, Siegen 1996, 
Die Überwindung des Theismus als Gegenwartsaufgabe, Siegen 1996, 
Umrisse einer Christologie der Geisteswissenschaft. Texte und Briefe, hg. v. Karen Swassjan. Verlag am Goetheanum, Dornach 1999, 
Ehrung – des Philosophen Herman Schmalenbach, Siegen 2006, 
Briefwechsel über die motorischen Nerven — Erweiterte Neuausgabe, www.edition-lgc.de, 2013

External links
 Summary of Ballmer's world view in his own words (in German and English)
 Max Stirner and Rudolf Steiner: Four Essays (Read the first few pages of the book in German and English)
 Ballmer's explanation of the nature of numbers (in German and English)
 Comparison of Thomas Aquinas' and Rudolf Steiner's epistemology (in German and English) from Ballmer's book "Anthroposophische Methodik"
 Comprehensive Bibliography
 Johannes Grebe: Kurze Übersicht: Vita Karl Ballmer (Entwurf)
 Peter Wyssling: The resurrection of Europe (English translation of Wyssling's "Die Auferstehung Europas") contains several quotes by and references to Karl Ballmer
 Peter Wyssling: Rudolf Steiners Kampf gegen die motorischen Nerven — Das Schicksal einer Weltanschauungsentscheidung in Karl Ballmer und Gerhard Kienle, www.edition-lgc.de, 2013

References

1891 births
1958 deaths
People from Aarau
20th-century Swiss painters
20th-century Swiss male artists
Swiss male painters
Anthroposophists